Cerro Guacha is a Miocene caldera in southwestern Bolivia's Sur Lípez Province. Part of the volcanic system of the Andes, it is considered to be part of the Central Volcanic Zone (CVZ), one of the three volcanic arcs of the Andes, and its associated Altiplano-Puna volcanic complex (APVC). A number of volcanic calderas occur within the latter.

Cerro Guacha and the other volcanoes of that region are formed from the subduction of the Nazca plate beneath the South America plate. Above the subduction zone, the crust is chemically modified and generates large volumes of melts that form the local caldera systems of the APVC. Guacha is constructed over a basement of sediments.

Extended volcanic activity has generated two nested calderas, a number of lava domes and lava flows and a central resurgent dome.

Geography and structure 
The caldera was discovered in 1978 thanks to Landsat imagery. It lies in Bolivia next to the Chilean frontier. The caldera is named after Cerro Guacha, a feature named as such by local topographic maps. Later research by the Geological Service of Bolivia indicated the presence of three welded tuffs. Paleogene red beds and Ordovician sediments form the basement of the caldera.

Cerro Guacha is part of the Altiplano-Puna volcanic complex, an area of extensive ignimbrite volcanism in the Central Andes between the Altiplano and the Atacama and associated with the Central Volcanic Zone of the Andes. Several large caldera complexes are found within this area, formed by crustal magma chambers generated by magmas derived from the melting of deep crustal layers. Present day activity is limited to geothermal phenomena in El Tatio, Sol de Manana and Guacha, with recent activity encompassing the extrusion of Quaternary lava domes and flows. Deformation in the area occurs beneath Uturuncu volcano north of the Guacha centre.

A westward-facing semicircular scarp contains subvertically banded Guacha ignimbrite layers rich in lithic clasts and is the presumable vent of the Guacha ignimbrite. Volcanic structures are aligned along the eastern moat of this structure, which is filled by lacustrine deposits and welded ignimbrites. Probably dacitic lava domes are found on the northern caldera rim, with the caldera floor possibly containing lava flows.

The caldera contains a resurgent dome, the western part of it is formed by the Tara ignimbrite while the eastern is part of the Guacha ignimbrite. This dome was cut by the Tara collapse, exposing  of Guacha ignimbrites. A second resurgence episode occurred inside the Tara caldera. Three lava domes, roughly coeval with the Tara ignimbrite, are constructed on the northern side of the resurgent dome. The western dome is named Chajnantor and is the most silica-rich of the domes. Rio Guacha in the middle is more dacitic. The Puripica Chico lavas on the western side of the caldera are not associated with a collapse. Dark coloured lava flows are found to the southwest of the caldera.

Some geothermal activity occurs within the caldera. Laudrum et al. suggested that the heat from Guacha and Pastos Grandes may be transferred to the El Tatio geothermal system to the west.

Geology 
Guacha is part of a volcanic complex in the back-arc region of the Andes in Bolivia. The Central Andes are underlaid by the Paleoproterozoic-Paleozoic Arequipa-Antofalla terrane. The Central Andes started to form 70 mya. Previously, the area was formed from a Paleozoic marine basin with some early volcanics.

Since the Jurassic, subduction has been occurring on the western margin of present-day South America, resulting in variable amounts of volcanic activity. A short interruption of volcanism, associated with a flattening of the subducting plate, occurred in the Oligocene 35-25 mya. Subsequently, renewed melt generation modified the overlying crust until major volcanism, associated with a "flare up" of ignimbritic volcanism occurred 10 mya.  beneath the local volcanic zone lies the Benioff zone of the subducting Nazca plate. Recently a change in volcanic activity away from ignimbritic towards cone-forming volcanism has been observed.

Local 
Gravitic research indicates the presence of a low density area centered beneath Guacha. The magmatic body underpinning the APVC is centered beneath Guacha. Guacha caldera is also closely linked to the neighbouring La Pacana caldera.

The Guacha caldera forms a structure with the neighbouring Cerro Panizos, Coranzulí and Vilama calderas associated with a fault named the Lípez lineament. Activity along this lineament commenced with the Abra Granada volcanic complex 10 mya ago and dramatically increased more than a million years later. Volcanic activity is linked to this fault zone and to the thermal maturation of the underlying crust. After 4 million years ago activity waned again in the Altiplano-Puna volcanic complex.

Geologic record 
Eruptive activity occurred at regular intervals.

Located at a high altitude in an area of long term arid climate has preserved old volcanic deposits over time. Thus, unlike in other areas of the world such as the Himalayas where water erosion governs the landscape the morphology of the Altiplano-Puna volcanic complex is mostly tectonic in origin.

Composition and magma properties
The Guacha Ignimbrite is rhyodacite and rich in crystals. The Chajnantor lava dome contains sanidine while Rio Guacha of dacitic composition contains amphibole and pyroxene. The Tara ignimbrite has a composition intermediary to that of these two domes, being andesitic-rhyolithic. The Guacha Ignimbrite contains 62-65% SiO2, Puripicar 67-68% and the Tara Ignimbrite 63%. Plagioclase and quartz are found in all ignimbrites.

Climate 
The climate of the Central Andes is characterized by extreme aridity. The eastern mountain chain of the Andes prevents moisture from the Amazon from reaching the Altiplano area. The area is also too far north for the precipitation associated with the Westerlies to reach Guacha. This arid climate may go back to the Mesozoic and was enhanced by geographical and orogenic changes during the Cenozoic.

Oxygen isotope analysis indicates that the Guacha caldera ignimbrites have had little influence from meteoric waters. This is consistent with the climate of the Guacha region displaying long-term aridity for the last 10 mya as well as with the scarcity of pronounced geothermal systems in the APVC which are essentially limited to the El Tatio and Sol de Manana fields.

Eruptive history
Guacha has been the source of eruptions with volumes of more than  dense rock equivalents. These eruptions in Guacha's case have a Volcanic explosivity index of 8. The close succession of multiple large scale eruptions indicates that plutons feeding such eruptions are assembled over millions of years.

The Guacha ignimbrite (including the Lowe Tara Ignimbrite, Chajnantor Tuff, Pampa Guayaques Tuff and possibly the Bonanza Ignimbrite) was first considered part of another ignimbrite named Atana Ignimbrite. Several different dates have been determined on the basis of argon-argon dating, including 5.81±0.01 on biotite and 5.65±0.01 mya on sanidine, which is the preferred age. One stream spreads  northwards past Uturunku volcano along the Quetena valley until Suni K'ira. Some ash deposits in the northern Chilean Coast Range are linked to the Guacha eruption. The Guacha ignimbrite was also known as Lower Tara at first.

The later Tara ignimbrite (including the Upper Tara Ignimbrite, the Filo Delgado Ignimbrite and the Pampa Tortoral Tuff) forms the western dome of the Guacha caldera and spreads mostly north and southeast, between Argentina, Bolivia and Chile. Several different dates have been determined on the basis of argon-argon dating, including 3.55±0.01 on biotite and 3.49±0.01 mya on sanidine, which is the preferred age. The Chajnantor lavas and the Rio Guacha dome in the caldera have been K-Ar dated at 3.67±0.13 and 3.61±0.02 mya respectively. This ignimbrite ponded inside the Guacha caldera, and one particularly thick layer (>) is found beneath Zapaleri stratovolcano. This ignimbrite was formerly known as Upper Tara. Geological considerations indicate that this ignimbrite formed from pre-existent melts and an influx of andesitic magma.

The Puripica Chico ignimbrite is known for having formed the Piedras de Dali hoodoos, named like that by tourists because of their surreal landscape. It has been argon-argon dated at 1.72±0.01 mya, making it the youngest Guacha caldera volcanite.

After research indicated that it was different from another ignimbrite named Atana, it was originally linked to the Guacha caldera but Salisbury et al. in 2011 linked the Tara ignimbrite to Guacha instead. Another ignimbrite associated with Guacha is the Guataquina Ignimbrite named after Paso de Guataquina. It was later interpreted to be a combination of the Guacha, Tara and non-Guacha Atana ignimbrites.

See also
 Altiplano-Puna volcanic complex
 Cerro Bitiche
 Galán
 La Pacana
 Pastos Grandes

References

External links
 

Volcanoes of Potosí Department
Andean Volcanic Belt
Supervolcanoes
VEI-8 volcanoes
Calderas of Bolivia
Miocene calderas
Miocene South America